Jack Nyanungo Ranguma, also known as JR, is a Kenyan politician and was the first Governor of Kisumu County, Kenya. He was elected on 6 March 2013.

History

Educational background
Jack Ranguma has a Master of Science (International Accounting and Management Information Systems) from the University of Illinois at Urbana-Champaign.

Professional career
Prior to entering politics Jack Ranguma had worked as an accountant for close to 30 years. In 1979, Jack Ranguma was appointed Audit Manager in charge of a large quasi-government n audit portfolio  by BDO International. he was promoted to Partner in charge of audit services in 1989, and served as Partner  and Head of Financial and Management Consultancy Services between 1991-2001. in 2002 he was appointed Commissioner of Income Tax, and later Commissioner of Domestic Taxes, Kenya Revenue Authority. In 2008 he became Senior Policy Advisor, Tax Justice Network Africa, a pan-African organization.

References

County Governors of Kenya
Living people
Orange Democratic Movement politicians
1954 births
Gies College of Business alumni